Nidularium rutilans is a plant species in the genus Nidularium. This species is endemic to Brazil.

Cultivars
 Nidularium 'Eureka'
 Nidularium 'Flamingo'
 Nidularium 'Leprosa'
 Nidularium 'Regal Lady'
 Nidularium 'Rusty'
 Nidularium 'Sao Paulo'
 × Niduregelia 'Heart Afire'
 × Niduregelia 'Souvenir De Casimir Morobe'

References

BSI Cultivar Registry Retrieved 11 October 2009

rutilans
Flora of Brazil